Arantxa Sánchez Vicario and Helena Suková were the defending champions but Suková did not participate this year. Sánchez Vicario paired up with Jana Novotná and successfully defended the title, defeating Robin White and Katerina Maleeva in the final, 6-3, 6-3.
With their semifinal loss to Maleeva and White, Gigi Fernández and Natasha Zvereva missed out on the Grand Slam in Women's Doubles for the 2nd straight year.

Seeds
Champion seeds are indicated in bold text while text in italics indicates the round in which those seeds were eliminated.

Draw

Finals

Top half

Section 1

Section 2

Bottom half

Section 3

Section 4

References

External links
1994 US Open – Women's draws and results at the International Tennis Federation

Women's Doubles
US Open (tennis) by year – Women's doubles
1994 in women's tennis
1994 in American women's sports